Jeff Krogh (born March 21, 1972) is an American former professional race car driver, who competed in the NASCAR Busch Grand National Series and the NASCAR Winston West Series. He was seriously injured in a crash during the 1999 Busch Grand National season and never returned to competition.

Personal life
Krogh was born in Kamiah, Idaho in 1972. Brother of fellow NASCAR driver Mark Krogh, he is married to Karla and has one child.

Career

Winston West and Winston Cup Series
After starting his career at local tracks in the western United States, Krogh moved up to the NASCAR Winston West Series in 1996. Competing full-time in the series, he competed in 14 of the 15 events that season, finishing second in both the championship chase and the Rookie-of-the-Year competition to Lance Hooper.

Krogh was credited as scoring a single victory over the course of the season. This was in the first of two races the Winston West Series ran during the season at Sears Point Raceway in Sonoma, California; the event was a combination event with the NASCAR Winston Cup Series Save Mart Supermarkets 300. Krogh qualified 28th for the race; he finished 35th overall in the event, but first among Winston West competitors; a second combination race later that year at Phoenix International Raceway saw Krogh finishing 41st overall and second among Winston West Series drivers to eventual champion Hooper; these were the only Winston Cup events he would compete in.

Busch Series
Following the 1996 season, Krogh, along with his brother, moved to the NASCAR Busch Grand National Series, still competing for his family's race team. Over the next three years, he competed in 57 events, with a best finish of fifth at Texas Motor Speedway in 1998.

In July 1999, during final practice for an event at The Milwaukee Mile, Krogh's car was involved in an accident; he suffered severe head injuries, placing Krogh into a coma for a month. Moved to a specialist hospital in Colorado for treatment before returning home that December, Krogh spent over a year in recovery and rehabilitation. He was able to return to normal life, but has no memory of the accident, and never competed in racing competition again.

Motorsports career results

NASCAR
(key) (Bold – Pole position awarded by qualifying time. Italics – Pole position earned by points standings or practice time. * – Most laps led.)

Winston Cup Series

Busch Series

References
Citations

Bibliography

External links
 

Living people
1972 births
People from Kamiah, Idaho
Racing drivers from Idaho
NASCAR drivers